Harry Eugene Bowser (born September 13, 1931) is a former Republican member of the Pennsylvania House of Representatives.

References

Republican Party members of the Pennsylvania House of Representatives
1931 births
Living people